Wrens is a city in Jefferson County, Georgia, United States. The population was 2,187 at the 2010 census. It is located on U.S. Route 1, thirty miles south of Augusta.

History
Wrens was laid out in 1884 when the railroad was extended to that point, and named after W.J. Wren, an early settler and merchant.

The Georgia General Assembly incorporated Wrens as a town in 1901. Wrens was incorporated again as a city in 1970.

Geography

Demographics

2020 census

As of the 2020 United States census, there were 2,217 people, 880 households, and 591 families residing in the city.

2000 census
At the 2000 census there were 2,314 people in 903 households, including 632 families, in the city. The racial makeup of the city was 65.17% African American, 33.19% White, 0.09% Native American, 0.17% Asian, 0.26% from other races, and 1.12% from two or more races. Hispanic or Latino people of any race were 0.78%.

Of the 903 households 31.2% had children under the age of 18 living with them, 34.4% were married couples living together, 31.6% had a female householder with no husband present, and 30.0% were non-families. 27.4% of households were one person and 12.0% were one person aged 65 or older.  The average household size was 2.56 and the average family size was 3.10.

The age distribution was 29.9% under the age of 18, 9.6% from 18 to 24, 23.8% from 25 to 44, 23.7% from 45 to 64, and 13.0% 65 or older.  The median age was 34 years. For every 100 females, there were 77.9 males.  For every 100 females age 18 and over, there were 72.9 males.

The median household income was $23,632 and the median family income  was $26,776. Males had a median income of $30,208 versus $20,625 for females. The per capita income for the city was $12,425.  About 23.8% of families and 27.4% of the population were below the poverty line, including 40.7% of those under age 18 and 22.1% of those age 65 or over.

Notable people
 Erskine Caldwell, author of Tobacco Road and God's Little Acre
 Dr. Molly Howard, 2008 National Principal of the Year, Secondary School
 Bruce Kelly, landscape architect who created the John Lennon memorial Strawberry Fields in Central Park, New York
 M.V. "Mark" Oliphant, actor, Tyler Perry's For Better or Worse,  TV One's Fatal Attraction
 Fernando Velasco, NFL center for the Tennessee Titans
 Sean Walker, current NFL wide receiver

See also

 Local radio station: WPEH, Big Peach Radio (92.1 FM and 1420 AM)
 Central Savannah River Area

References

External links

 The News and Farmer and Wadley Herald / Jefferson Reporter, the county's weekly newspaper and the oldest weekly newspaper in Georgia
 Official Jefferson County economic wevelopment Website
 Old Quaker Road historical marker
 Ways Baptist Church and Stellaville School historical marker

Cities in Georgia (U.S. state)
Cities in Jefferson County, Georgia
1884 establishments in Georgia (U.S. state)
Populated places established in 1884